Defending champion Ivan Lendl successfully defended his title, defeating Boris Becker in the final, 6–4, 6–4, 6–4 to win the singles title at the 1986 Nabisco Masters.

Draw

Finals

Fred Perry group
 Standings are determined by: 1. number of wins; 2. number of matches; 3. in two-players-ties, head-to-head records; 4. in three-players-ties, percentage of sets won, or of games won; 5. steering-committee decision.

Don Budge group
 Standings are determined by: 1. number of wins; 2. number of matches; 3. in two-players-ties, head-to-head records; 4. in three-players-ties, percentage of sets won, or of games won; 5. steering-committee decision.

See also
ATP World Tour Finals appearances

References
1986 Masters-Singles

Singles